APHS may refer to:

 Abbey Park High School, Oakville, Ontario, Canada
 Aberfoyle Park High School, South Australia, Australia
Academy Park High School, Sharon hill, Pennsylvania 
 Alderman Peel High School, Norfolk, England
 Allen Park High School Allen Park, Michigan
 Andrada Polytechnic High School, Vail, Arizona
 Arthur Phillip High School, New South Wales, Australia
 Averill Park High School, Averill Park, New York
 Avon Park High School, Avon Park, Florida